"Tell Me What You Like" is a song recorded by Swedish singer Jessica Folcker, released in 1998, as the first single from her first studio album, Jessica (1998). It is produced by Denniz Pop, Kristian Lundin and Max Martin. Pop and Martin co-wrote it with British music producer and songwriter Herbie Crichlow. It was an international hit, peaking at number ten in Sweden, number 13 in France, number 16 in Norway and number 20 in Denmark. A music video was also produced to promote the single.

Track listing

Charts

References

 

1998 debut singles
1998 songs
Jive Records singles
Songs written by Denniz Pop
Songs written by Herbie Crichlow
Songs written by Max Martin
Song recordings produced by Denniz Pop
Song recordings produced by Max Martin
English-language Swedish songs